Richard Bradford Coolidge (September 14, 1879 – January 18, 1957) was a Massachusetts politician.

Early life and family
Coolidge was born in the Deering Center area of Portland, Maine. He was brother of Massachuestts politician and Lieutenant Governor Arthur W. Coolidge. He was the fourth cousin of President Calvin Coolidge.

Education
Coolidge graduated from Tufts College in 1902 and served as a trustee of the school from 1924 to 1944 and from 1953 to 1957.  He attended Harvard Law School.

Career as an attorney
Coolidge practiced in the law firm "French and Curtiss."

Political service
From 1920 to 1922, Coolidge represented Medford and Winchester in the Massachusetts House of Representatives, where he served as the clerk of the judiciary committee.  Coolidge served as the mayor of Medford, Middlesex County, Massachusetts, United States, from 1923 to 1926.  He later served as a delegate to the Republican National Convention from Massachusetts in 1928.

Death
Coolidge died in Concord, Massachusetts in 1957.

See also
 1920 Massachusetts legislature
 1921–1922 Massachusetts legislature

References

1879 births
1957 deaths
Tufts University alumni
Harvard Law School alumni
Massachusetts lawyers
Mayors of Medford, Massachusetts
Politicians from Portland, Maine
Republican Party members of the Massachusetts House of Representatives
Coolidge family